Mastira is a genus of spiders in the family Thomisidae. It was first described in 1891 by Tamerlan Thorell. , it contains 10 species.

Species
Mastira comprises the following species:
Mastira adusta (L. Koch, 1867) – New Guinea, Samoa, Australia (Queensland, New South Wales)
Mastira bipunctata Thorell, 1891 – Taiwan, Singapore, Indonesia (Sumatra)
Mastira bitaeniata (Thorell, 1878) – Indonesia (Ambon)
Mastira cimicina (Thorell, 1881) – Philippines, Indonesia (Aru Is.), Australia (Queensland)
Mastira flavens (Thorell, 1877) – Taiwan, Philippines, Indonesia (Sulawesi)
Mastira menoka (Tikader, 1963) – India
Mastira nicobarensis (Tikader, 1980) – India (mainland, Nicobar Is.)
Mastira nitida (Thorell, 1877) – Philippines, Indonesia (Sulawesi, Ambon, Moluccas)
Mastira serrula Tang & Li, 2010 – China
Mastira tegularis Xu, Han & Li, 2008 – China (Hong Kong)

References

Thomisidae
Thomisidae genera
Spiders of Asia
Spiders of Australia
Taxa named by Tamerlan Thorell